Yarka, officially Yirka, is an Israeli Druze village and local council in the Northern District of Israel. In 2019 it had a population of 17,171, 98.8% of them members of the Druze community, with a small Muslim (1.0%) and Christian (0.1%) minorities.

History

Ancient era
Yarka is an ancient village site, where old columns and cisterns have been found. A Greek inscription here dating from the early Christian era was found by Clermont-Ganneau in 1881.

Crusader period
During the Crusader era, Yarka was known under the name of Arket. In 1220, Joscelin III's daughter Beatrix de Courtenay and her husband Otto von Botenlauben, Count of Henneberg, sold their land, including Arket, to the Teutonic Knights.

Ottoman era
In 1517, Yarka was incorporated into the Ottoman Empire after Palestine was captured from the Mamluks. By 1596, Yarka appeared in the Ottoman tax registers as part of the Nahiya of Akka of the Liwa of Safad. It had a population of 174 Muslim households and 24 bachelors.

A map by Pierre Jacotin from Napoleon's invasion of 1799 showed the town under the name Hierka.

The French explorer Victor Guérin visited Yarka in 1875, and wrote that "cut stones of ancient appearance have been used in building the modern houses. [...] About a hundred cisterns cut in rock, a half of which are no longer used, and the other half serve for the wants of the people, reveal the existence in this place of an ancient locality of some importance." In 1881, the Palestine Exploration Fund's Survey of Western Palestine described Yarka as a well-built stone village inhabited by 400 Druze who grew olives and figs.

A population list from about 1887 showed that Yerka had about 1,285 inhabitants; virtually all Druze.

British Mandate era
In the 1922 census of Palestine conducted by the British Mandate authorities, Yarka had a population of 978 residents; 937 Druze, 26 Muslims, and 15 Christians, where the Christians were 11 Orthodox, 3 Roman Catholics, and 1 Maronite. The population increased in the 1931 census to 1,196; 1,138 Druze, 46 Muslims, and 11 Christians living in a total of 343 houses.

According to an official land and population survey, Yarka had a population of 1,500 in 1945; 70 Muslims, 10 Christians, and 1420 Druze, encapsulating with 42,452 dunams of land. Of this, 5,747 dunams were plantations and irrigable land, 5,909 used for cereal, while 140 dunams were built-up land in 1945.

Religious sites

Yarka contains the maqam ("saintly-person tomb") of Shaykh Ghana'im Abu Saraya, a native of the town and one of the first missionary sheikhs to spread the Druze faith in Galilee during the 11th century. He was the principle Druze sheikh in the Acre coastal area. Druze tradition has it that Abu Saraya is buried underneath the floor of the shrine.

The town is also the site of the al-Nabi Siddiq maqam. The Druze associate al-Nabi Siddiq with the biblical figure Hushai. According to this tradition, the name "Yarka" derives from "ha-Arki". The Druze prayer house "Khalwah ash-Sheikh Muhammad" is situated just east of Yarka. It was built sometime prior to 1931 by the religious sheikh Muhammad Mu'addi as a center for Druze religious studies.

Economy
Yarka houses Kadmani Metal Works, Inc., now defunct. My Baby, Israel's largest store for children's and baby's supplies, with 11,000 meters of retail space, is also stationed in Yarka. The store has an annual turnover of NIS 100 million ($27.1 million USD).

See also
 Druze in Israel

References

Bibliography

 (p. 152)

 (p. 463)

External links
Official website
Welcome To Yirka
Survey of Western Palestine, Map 3: IAA, Wikimedia commons

Arab localities in Israel
Druze communities in Israel
Local councils in Northern District (Israel)